The Sydney Harbour Federation Trust ("Harbour Trust") is an Australian Government agency established in 2001 to preserve and rehabilitate a number of defence and other Commonwealth lands in and around Sydney Harbour. The Trust has been focused on the remediation of protected islands and make the islands accessible to the public.

Jurisdiction
The lands managed by the Harbour Trust are:

Cockatoo Island
 Headland Park, Mosman (Middle Head, Georges Heights and Chowder Bay)
 North Head Sanctuary (Former School of Artillery), North Head, Manly
Woolwich Dock and Parklands
Macquarie Lighthouse
Snapper Island
Former Marine Biological Station, Watsons Bay
HMAS Platypus, Neutral Bay

A number of other bodies have responsibility for the management of lands around Sydney Harbour including the Sydney Harbour National Park, an entity of the New South Wales State Government.

Parking and other illegal activities on Sydney Harbour Trust land is enforced as a Commonwealth offence by special Sydney Harbour Trust rangers, which is a minimum $100 fine and is not enforced as a NSW Government State Debt Recovery Office matter.

See also
Protected areas of New South Wales

References

External links
Sydney Harbour Federation Trust website

Commonwealth Government agencies of Australia
Organisations based in Sydney
2001 establishments in Australia
Sydney Harbour